Gideon Stein (born December 19, 1971, in Washington, D.C.) is an American entrepreneur and education activist. He is the Chairman of Write Label, a crowd-sourced platform for short-form writing, president of The Moriah Fund, Chairman of Chalkbeat, and a member of the board of directors of New Classrooms, and Narrative 4. He is the former vice chairman of the board of Success Academy Charter Schools, a high-performing charter school management organization in New York City.

Education 
Stein graduated with honors from Wesleyan University with a degree in economics and history. He attended St Edmund Hall at Oxford University as a visiting scholar in development economics and European history.

Career 
Stein is the CEO of Write Label, a crowd-sourced platform for short-form writing. He was the founder and CEO of LightSail Education, an adaptive literacy solution for K-12. Stein was the founder, chairman and CEO of Omnipod, Inc., a leading on-demand provider of real-time messaging to the enterprise market, until its sale in 2005 to MessageLabs Group, Ltd., one of the world’s largest private software companies (and now a division of Symantec). Stein was a founding partner of MR Ventures, a private investment firm with a portfolio of companies concentrated in media, commerce and software. Stein also served on the board of directors of the Real Silk Investment Company, a publicly traded regulated investment company, until its sale to Lord Abbett Affiliated Funds.

Philanthropy 
In May 2019, Stein became the President of his family's private foundation, The Moriah Fund. Stein is a board member of New Classrooms. He serves as the Chairman of Chalkbeat, a leading non-profit education news outlet for New York City, Denver, Indianapolis, Memphis, Chicago, Philadelphia, Newark, and Detroit. He is on the board of directors of Narrative 4, a global empathy building organization, as well as on the board of directors for University Prep Public Schools.

References 

1971 births
Living people
Wesleyan University alumni
People from Washington, D.C.